Newark Academy is a coeducational private day school located in Livingston, Essex County, New Jersey, United States, serving students in sixth through twelfth grades. The school has been accredited by the Middle States Association of Colleges and Schools Commission on Elementary and Secondary Schools since 1928.

Newark Academy is one of several pre-Revolutionary War schools still operating in the United States and is considered the seventh-oldest private school in the country and the second-oldest day school in the state of New Jersey (behind Rutgers Preparatory School). The Academy was founded in 1774 by Alexander MacWhorter, a prominent cleric and advisor to George Washington, and was located on Market Street in Downtown Newark. Newark Academy was briefly closed after it was burned by the British during the Revolutionary War. The school then reopened in new quarters in 1792. In 1802, the Academy opened a separate division for girls, but this program was closed in 1859. After 1929, it moved to First Street in the Roseville section of Newark. The Academy moved from Newark to its current location, a  campus in Livingston, in 1964, and became fully co-educational in 1971.

For the 2022–23 school year, the school has an enrollment of 674 students and 78 classroom teachers for a student–teacher ratio of 7:1. Students of color represent 60 percent of the population.

Niche.com ranked Newark Academy second in its "Best College Prep Private High Schools in New Jersey", third in "Best Private High Schools in New Jersey" and seventh in "Best High Schools for STEM in New Jersey." The school received an A+ for teachers, academics, clubs & activities, and college prep. Niche ranked it as the 12th best private high school in the New York City area.
As of 2022, it ranks the 32nd best private high school in the United States according to Niche.com.

Campus
Newark Academy is located on a  campus in northern New Jersey.

The Wilf Middle School wing opened in fall 2017 and houses two floors of classrooms, laboratories, offices and common spaces that accommodate Middle School teachers and students. Classrooms have Apple TV technology and SmartBoards, which have since been implemented unilaterally throughout the school. During the construction of the new middle school, Newark Academy also renovated all of the sciences labs, starting with the second-floor natural science and chemistry rooms, and moving on to the first-floor physical science room. These rooms, as well as the laboratories in the middle school, include lab equipment.

The Coraci Performance Hall, which opened in summer 2020, is a 700-seat facility that has been completely rebuilt to accommodate the increased size of the student body for Morning Meetings and to provide a performance space equal in quality to the outstanding student artists that take the stage for dance, choral, orchestral, jazz, and theatrical performances throughout the school year.

The Cetrulo Family Fencing Center received several physical and technological renovations in summer 2019. The installation of new, specialized flooring and five strips, which provide electronic scoring, makes it one of the finest fencing centers in the country.

The Hawkes Memorial Library, opened in 1974, houses a 23,000-volume collection, as well as a vast periodical and microfilm collection.

The Elizabeth B. McGraw Arts Center, which opened in 1992, contains three studio art classrooms (ceramics, drawing, and painting), a darkroom, a band/orchestra room, a choral room, a dance studio, a "black box" theater and an art gallery.

The Morris Interactive Learning Center, opened in 1995, houses 18 iMac computers, a multimedia system (interactive whiteboard and projector,
Blu-ray DVD system), and scanners and printers for student and faculty use.

The Geochron (Geochron Global Time Indicator), which was purchased in 2004, is located in the main entrance hall and shows at any given moment where it is light and dark in the world.

The William E. and Carol G. Simon Family Field House, or the "new wing" opened in 2001. This  athletic center houses a gymnasium with three basketball courts, a six-lane pool with a spectator area, a four-lane track and a fitness center. Wrestling and fencing gyms are located in the main building.

Newark Academy's outdoor facilities include courtyards with seating areas, two baseball diamonds, a softball field, an all-weather track, a field hockey area, two lacrosse and soccer fields, two football fields, one basketball half-court, a cross country course and 10 tennis courts.

Newark Academy's campus is bordered by woods along the Passaic River. In September 2002, the school marked the opening of The Carol J. Heaney Nature Trail, a  system of hiking trails and outdoor classrooms.

The school has embarked on initiatives to minimize its impact on the environment. Current initiatives include increased recycling efforts, the introduction of energy-efficient lighting, the exploration of renewable energy options, the Passaic River clean-up and maintenance of a campus vegetable garden.

Faculty and administration
Newark Academy's faculty has an average of 17.5 years of teaching experience, and 90 percent of the 92 teachers and administrators have advanced degrees; 14 have earned doctorate degrees.

In 2007, Donald M. Austin was appointed as the 49th Head of School for Newark Academy. He previously served as resident director for School Year Abroad in Rennes, France. He earned an undergraduate degree in English and French from Georgetown University and a master's of philosophy in French studies from New York University.

Austin's team of administrators includes Cathy Atwell, Ed.D., upper school principal; Tom Ashburn, middle school principal; Pegeen Galvin, dean of students; and Traci Osterhagen Brock, dean of faculty.

Student body
For the 2022–2023 school year, Newark Academy has students from over 90 communities in grades 6–12. There are 470 students in the Upper School and 204 students in Middle School. Students of color represent 60% of the student population; international students from countries including Eritrea, India, Singapore and the UK bring a truly global perspective to the community.

Academics

Graduation requirements
In order to graduate students must complete four years of English, three years of humanities, three years of mathematics, three years of laboratory science, proficiency in a second language (level 3), one year of arts, three June Terms, an immersion trip, 40 hours of community service, and a senior project.

Academic offerings
Newark Academy offers a wide variety of classes across disciplines and at many different levels. Newark Academy offers many IB and AP classes, in addition to other college-level classes in Multivariable calculus, Differential Equations, Linear algebra, Non-Euclidean geometry, and Number theory.

Newark Academy is part of the Malone Schools Online Network, a group of 26 elite independent schools across the country that offer a selection of 36 classes available online via webcam in conjunction with one another, run by teachers at the member schools. MSON offers many college-level and elective classes such as "Are We Rome?," "Creative Writing in the Digital Age" and "Positive Psychology."

Newark Academy also offers an Independent Studies program for seniors. Seniors may elect to take a self-designed full-year course on a topic of their choosing. Students work with a faculty advisor, and often one other student who helped design the course, throughout the year researching the topic at hand and culminating in a final project. Courses in the past have focused on feminism, and American modern judicial history, amongst other subjects.

Advanced curricula
Newark Academy is the only independent school in New Jersey that offers both the Advanced Placement (AP) and International Baccalaureate Diploma (IB) programs.

Advanced Placement
The College Board's Advanced Placement Program (AP) offers high school students the opportunity to do college-level work. Successful achievement on the culminating exams may result in credit or advanced placement upon matriculation to college. Newark Academy offers coursework leading to 21 AP exams in all five academic disciplines.

International Baccalaureate
In 1991, Newark Academy became the first school in New Jersey to grant the International Baccalaureate diploma. The I.B. diploma is awarded following the successful completion of a rigorous two-year curriculum. 47 members of the Class of 2021 pursued the full IB diploma. Approximately 95 percent of the Class of 2023 is enrolled in at least one IB course.

Athletics
The Newark Academy Minutemen compete in the Super Essex Conference, which is comprised of public and private high schools in Essex County and operates under the supervision of the New Jersey State Interscholastic Athletic Association (NJSIAA). Before the NJSIAA's 2010 realignment, the school had previously participated in the Colonial Hills Conference which included public and private high schools covering Essex County, Morris County and Somerset County in west Central Jersey. With 315 students in grades 10-12, the school was classified by the NJSIAA for the 2019–20 school year as Non-Public B for most athletic competition purposes, which included schools with an enrollment of 37 to 366 students in that grade range (equivalent to Group I for public schools). The school was classified by the NJSIAA as Non-Public Group II for football for 2018–2020.

Newark Academy offers a total of 25 varsity sports programs over the course of the school year:
 Fall sports: boys' and girls' cross country, field hockey, football, boys' and girls' soccer, girls' tennis, and girls' volleyball.
 Winter sports: boys' and girls' basketball, fencing, boys' and girls' fencing, boys' and girls'  swimming, winter track and boys' wrestling.
 Spring sports: baseball, boys' and girls' golf, boys' and girls' lacrosse, softball, boys' tennis and boys' and girls' track and field. 

Middle School students are required to participate in at least one sport each season. Students in the Upper School are not required to play a sport but approximately 87% choose to do so.

The boys' fencing team was the overall state champion in 2020 and was the foil team winner in 2014 and 2016. Head Coach Daniel Bailey-Yavonditte was named the USA Fencing 2020 High School Coach of the Year.

The girls' tennis team won the Non-Public Group B state championship in 1992, 1993, 1996-2002, 2010, 2011, 2013-2016 and 2021. The team won the Tournament of Champions in 1993 (defeating runner-up Moorestown High School in the finals), 1996-1998 (vs. Millburn High School all three years), 1999-2001 (vs. Moorestown all three years) and 2002 (vs. Cherry Hill High School East). The program's 16 state championships are the fourth-most in the state and the eight ToC titles are ranked second.

The boys' tennis team was the Non-Public state group champions in 1992-2007, 2009, and 2011-2021. The program's 27 state group titles are the most of any school in the state and the streak of 16 consecutive titles from 1992 to 2007 is the state's longest. The team won the Tournament of Champions in 1995-2001, 2003-2005, 2009, 2016 and 2021. The program's 14 ToC titles are the most in New Jersey. The 2021 team won the program's record 27th state title with a 5-0 win in the Non-Public tournament final against Pingry School.

The wrestling team won the Non-Parochial Group B state sectional championship and the Non-Parochial B state title in 1997.

The boys' soccer team won the Non-Public Group B state championship in 2007 (defeating runner-up Holy Cross Preparatory Academy in the final of the tournament) and 2015 (vs. Moorestown Friends School). The 2007 team won the Non-Public B state title with a 1-0 win against Holy Cross in the championship game.

The boys' cross-country team won the Non-Public Group B state championship in 2015, 2018, and 2019.

The volleyball team won the program’s first-ever NJSIAA Non-Public B state championship in 2021, defeating Immaculate Conception High School in the finals.

From 1984 to 1989, Newark Academy was the site of the Livingston Open, a Grand Prix tennis circuit tournament. The Grand Prix was the only professional circuit from 1985 until it was succeeded by the ATP Tour in 1990.  The tournament was won by Andre Agassi in 1988, earning him the seventh title in his career.

Publications
Currently, Newark Academy has four publications: the student newspaper, The Minuteman in publication since 1941; the newspaper's annual magazine Minuteman Life; the yearbook, The Polymnian; and the literary magazine, Prisms. Newark Academy also publishes an alumni magazine, Lumen, twice a year.

Notable alumni

 Ryan Adeleye (born 1987), Israeli-American professional soccer player.
 Samuel Fowler Bigelow (1837–1915), judge, attorney and author
 Jennifer Choe-Groves (born 1969, class of 1987), Federal Judge of the United States Court of International Trade.
 Samuel S. Coursen (1926–1950, class of 1945), posthumous recipient of the Medal of Honor during the Korean War.
 Lanny Davis (born 1945, class of 1963), lawyer, consultant, lobbyist, author and television commentator, who served in both the Clinton and Bush administrations.
 James Mapes Dodge (1852–1915), mechanical engineer, inventor and industrialist who served as president of the American Society of Mechanical Engineers.
 Forrest F. Dryden (1864–1932), president of Prudential Insurance Company of America (now Prudential Financial) from 1912 until 1922.
 Jared Gilman (born 1998), actor who appeared in the film Moonrise Kingdom.
 Justin Gimelstob (born 1977), ATP professional tennis player.
 Leo M. Gordon (born 1952), Justice of the United States Court of International Trade.
 Walter Granville-Smith (1870–1938) illustrator and painter who produced the first colored illustration that appeared in the United States.
Asher Grodman (born 1987), actor
 Matt Gutman (born 1977), ABC News correspondent.
 Alan B. Handler (born 1931), New Jersey Supreme Court Justice from 1977 until 1999.
 Maya Hayes (born 1992), assistant coach for Minnesota Golden Gophers women's soccer team and former player for Sky Blue FC.
 Coleman Hughes (born 1996), political columnist.
 Chris Jacobs (born 1964), swimming medalist at the 1988 Summer Olympics.
 Denise J. Jamieson (born , class of 1983), gynecologist who is the James Robert McCord Chair in Gynecology and Obstetrics at Emory University and former medical officer in the United States Public Health Service.
 Ernest Lester Jones (1876–1929), head of the United States Coast and Geodetic Survey from 1914 until his death.
 Stacey Kent (born 1965), jazz singer.
 Thomas Kiernan (1933–2003), writer who was the author of a biographies that featured figures including Laurence Olivier, Jane Fonda, John Steinbeck, and Yasser Arafat.
 Jay I. Kislak (1922–2018), businessman, philanthropist, bibliophile, and aviator.
 Thomas N. McCarter (1867–1955), CEO of PSE&G Corporation, developer of Penn Station, and original benefactor of the McCarter Theatre in Princeton.
 Roderick Fletcher Mead (1900-1971), painter best known for his engravings
 Akshay Oberoi (born 1985), Bollywood actor who made his film debut in the 2010 film Isi Life Mein.
 James Parker (1854–1934), Major General in the United States Army and a Medal of Honor recipient for his role in the Philippine–American War during 1899.
 Daniel Quillen (1940–2011), mathematician and Fields Medal recipient in 1978 for his work on algebraic K-theory.
 Stuart Risch (class of 1980), United States Army lieutenant general who has serevd as the 41st Judge Advocate General of the United States Army.
 Lyndsey Scott (born 1984), model, software developer and actress.
 William E. Simon (1927–2000), 63rd Secretary of the Treasury under Richard Nixon.
 Gus Stager (born ), coach of 1960 U.S. Olympic swim team; swimming coach at University of Michigan for 25 years.
 Bo Sullivan (1937-2000), chairman of the New Jersey Turnpike Authority and a Republican Party politician who sought the nomination for Governor of New Jersey in the 1981 primary.
 Richard Thaler (born 1945, class of 1963), economist specializing in behavioral economics and Nobel Prize recipient in 2017 for his contributions to the field.
 Salamishah Tillet (born 1975, class of 1992), 2022 Pulitzer Prize in Criticism winner, feminist activist, scholar and writer.
 Franklin Van Antwerpen (born 1941, class of 1960), Senior United States Circuit Judge on the United States Court of Appeals for the Third Circuit.
 Cortlandt Whitehead (1842-1922), bishop of the Episcopal Diocese of Pittsburgh from 1882 to 1922.
 Jocelyn Willoughby (born 1998, class of 2016), basketball player for the New York Liberty of the WNBA.
 Carl Zigrosser (1891–1975), art dealer best known for founding and running the Weyhe Gallery in the 1920s and 1930s

References

External links
 
 Data for Newark Academy, National Center for Education Statistics

1774 establishments in New Jersey
Educational institutions established in 1774
History of Newark, New Jersey
International Baccalaureate schools in New Jersey
Livingston, New Jersey
Middle States Commission on Secondary Schools
New Jersey Association of Independent Schools
Private high schools in Essex County, New Jersey
Private middle schools in New Jersey
Pre-statehood history of New Jersey